Bomber Aircrew of World War II: True Stories of Frontline Air Combat is a book by military historian and author Bruce Barrymore Halpenny. It is about the aircrew of RAF Bomber Command in World War II. This group had over 300,000 operations flying over enemy territory during the war, losing 50,000 airmen and 8,000 British aircraft.

The book has first hand accounts by veteran RAF aircrew and their support staff, giving an insight into life in RAF Bomber Command as well as the creation and development of the bomber airfield for a new form of war. There is also a full account of all of Bomber Command's Victoria Cross awards. Reviewers have noted that the book also features previously unpublished photographs.

References

Bomber aircrew in World War II

2004 non-fiction books
21st-century history books
History books about World War II
Aviation history of the United Kingdom
Works by Bruce Barrymore Halpenny
History of the Royal Air Force during World War II
Royal Air Force mass media